20th Century Masters – The Millennium Collection: The Best of Eric Clapton is a compilation album by the British rock musician Eric Clapton. It was released on 15 June 2004, by Polydor Records and is part of Universal's 20th Century Masters – The Millennium Collection series.

Background and commercial performance
The compilation album has eleven tracks that Clapton recorded in the 1970s both as a solo artist and with Derek and the Dominos. Glyn Johns produced the album in association with Tom Dowd. Although the release sold 1,366,610 copies in the United States, it has not been certified platinum by the Recording Industry Association of America.

Critical reception
The AllMusic critic Stephen Thomas Erlewine thinks that the compilation release "is an excellent distillation of his [Eric Clapton's] signature songs of the '70s". He continues, "While it focuses on his solo recordings, it's not limited to them, throwing in two cuts from Derek and the Dominos -- "Layla," of course, plus "Bell Bottom Blues"—which help complete the portrait of Clapton in the '70s." Erlewine also points the way to Clapton's massively successful compilation Timepieces: Best Of Eric Clapton by noting that "20th Century Masters is essentially a revised Time Pieces, both running 11 tracks, nine of which are shared between the two records."  ("Bell Bottom Blues" and "Let It Rain" replace "Willie and the Hand Jive" and "Swing Low, Sweet Chariot", respectively). He finishes his review by rating the album with 4.5 of possible 5 stars.

Track listing
"I Shot the Sheriff" (Bob Marley) – 4:26
"After Midnight" (J.J. Cale) – 2:53
"Knockin' on Heaven's Door" (Bob Dylan) – 4:24
"Wonderful Tonight" (Eric Clapton) – 3:45
"Layla" (Clapton · Jim Gordon) – 7:06
"Cocaine" (Cale) – 3:40
"Lay Down Sally" (Clapton · George Terry · Marcy Levy) – 3:55
"Bell Bottom Blues" (Clapton) – 5:04
"Promises" (Richard Feldman · Roger Linn) – 3:03
"Let It Rain" (Clapton · Bonnie Bramlett) – 5:03
"Let It Grow" (Clapton) – 4:58

Chart positions and certifications

Weekly charts

Year-end charts

Certifications and sales

References

External links
20th Century Masters – The Millennium Collection: The Best of Eric Clapton at Discogs

2004 compilation albums
Eric Clapton compilation albums
Polydor Records compilation albums
Universal Music Group compilation albums
Clapton, Eric